Simona Dumitrita Muşat (née Strimbeschi, born 16 September 1981) is a Romanian rower. She competed at the 2008 Summer Olympics, where she won a bronze medal in women's eight.

References 

Living people
1981 births
Romanian female rowers
Olympic bronze medalists for Romania
Olympic rowers of Romania
Rowers at the 2004 Summer Olympics
Rowers at the 2008 Summer Olympics
Olympic medalists in rowing
Medalists at the 2008 Summer Olympics
European Rowing Championships medalists
Sportspeople from Botoșani
21st-century Romanian women